Holland Village, often abbreviated as Holland V, is a neighbourhood located along the boundary between the planning areas of Bukit Timah and Queenstown in the Central Region of Singapore.

Holland Village is a popular shopping and dining destination for younger Singaporeans and expatriates. It is dominated by and often visited solely for its eateries and watering holes, along with some specialist shops.

The area is served by its own MRT station, which opened in 2011.

Etymology
Holland Village was named after Holland Road, which in turn was named after Hugh Holland in 1907; Holland, an architect and amateur actor, was an early resident of the area. The roads 'Holland Avenue', 'Holland Close' and 'Holland Drive' were officially named after the principal road in 1972. Holland Road is known as hue hng au in Hokkien, meaning "behind the flower garden". The "flower garden" refers to the Botanic Gardens.

Neighbourhoods within the Holland Village area
Several areas are considered to be in the Holland Village area.

Holland Village
Holland Village is a crescent-shaped area of shophouses and small malls set around Lorong Liput and Lorong Mambong, surrounded by Holland Road and Holland Avenue.

Chip Bee Gardens
On the other side of Holland Avenue is a neighbourhood that was formerly developed as British military housing in the 1950s, but is now owned by the Singapore government and rented to private individuals and, on Jalan Merah Saga, businesses. Chip Bee Gardens has a reputation for being an enclave of Western expatriates, although many Singaporeans and other Asians reside there too.

Holland Close
Holland Close is a large HDB estate located at the southern part of Chip Bee Gardens. Shuang Long Shan, also known as the Holland Close Cemetery, is a cemetery for the Hakka community since the 1960s.

Food and beverage outlets
Many food chains in Singapore, such as Crystal Jade, The Coffee Bean & Tea Leaf, Sushi Tei, Subway, and Häagen-Dazs, are in Holland Village. A 24-hour kopitiam, a market and a food court are also present with food stalls selling local and western dishes. Other eating places include Starbucks and several dessert, Western cuisine and Japanese cuisine outlets. The gentrification of the Holland V area is characterised by the more up-market dining options such as the ethnic restaurants as well as franchises such as Tapas Bar.  Other prominent bars include Tango's, Baden, Harry's Bar and Wala Wala.

Holland Village has a reputation as an expatriate neighbourhood but nevertheless attracts a majority of locals to its pubs and restaurants.

The Village has been a cradle for a number of lifestyle trends in Singapore. In the 1980s, Palm's Wine Bar along Lorong Mambong started the trend for wine bars. During that period, other cafes like Batter Batter (famous for its butterscotch and other pancakes) and Milano Pizza (which became a successful chain in the 80s) also sprang up in Holland V.

In the 90s, the restaurant Original Sin started a wave of upscale vegetarian dining when its Australian-Italian owner introduced Singapore to her first Mediterranean vegetarian dining experience in Chip Bee Gardens. Original Sin's menu was created by co-owner and culinary director, Marisa Bertocchi. From Adelaide in Australia, Marisa worked in many of that city's restaurants and hotels before heading to Singapore where she quickly earned praise for her vegetarian creations at Michelangelo's.

Coffee Club, Singapore's first gourmet coffee shop, opened its first outlet in Holland Village in 1991. This was before the arrival of Starbucks, Coffee Bean and TCC years later, while Wala Wala asserted its presence among the rest with a customer base as wide as its range of imported beers and its nightly band performances.

Today, the rows of shops along Lorong Mambong and Jalan Merah Saga house some of Singapore's most famous and characteristic pubs and restaurants, many of which are fully booked during weekends.

Shops and services

Holland Village has a variety of commercial amenities. There are three shopping centres in Holland Village: Raffles Holland V, Holland Road Shopping Centre and Holland V Shopping Mall.

Retail establishments are located along four streets and two shopping buildings. These streets are Jalan Merah Saga and Holland Avenue on the same side, and Lorong Liput and Lorong Mambong on the opposite side. The shopping buildings are Holland Road Shopping Centre and Raffles Holland V Mall which is along Holland Avenue, and Holland Piazza along Lorong Liput. These buildings along Holland Avenue are often casually referred to by sales assistants as Holland Village Shopping Centre, which in name is a non-existent landmark.

Transport
Within Singapore's transport system, Holland Village is linked to Orchard Road via Holland Road. Holland Village MRT station is located on the Circle MRT line.

Politics
Holland Village is within the Buona Vista division of Tanjong Pagar Group Representation Constituency (GRC) with its Member of Parliament being Minister of Trade & Industry Chan Chun Sing since 2011. The constituency was previously a SMC until it has been absorbed into Tanjong Pagar GRC in 1997, and then carved out to Holland-Bukit Panjang GRC from 2001 to 2006 and Holland-Bukit Timah GRC from 2006 to 2011 before returning to Tanjong Pagar in the 2011 elections.

In media
In 2003, the neighbourhood of Holland Village was featured and filmed in a TV series by Mediacorp. The series titled Holland V was broadcast on Mediacorp Channel 8 and it broke records for garnering the most acting nominations awarded to a cast in a single year, and for becoming the first show to win all four acting categories at the Star Awards.

See also
 List of restaurant districts and streets

References

 

Restaurant districts and streets in Singapore
Places in Singapore
Bukit Timah